Maria Medina may refer to:
 Maria Medina (Viganò), an Austrian ballet dancer
 Maria Medina (archer), Puerto Rican archer
 Maria do Carmo Medina, Portuguese-born Angolan human rights defender